Vondruška is a Czech surname. Notable people with the surname include:

Pavel Vondruška (1925–2011), Czech actor and musician
Rostislav Vondruška (born 1961), Czech politician
Zdeňka Bezděková  née Vondrušková

Czech-language surnames